The Raritan River Bridge is a rail bridge over the Raritan River, in New Brunswick and Highland Park in Middlesex County, New Jersey, U.S. The arch bridge carries the Northeast Corridor (NEC) at MP 30.92. It used by Amtrak, including Northeast Regional service, and New Jersey Transit's Northeast Corridor Line. It also crosses over New Jersey Route 18 and the East Coast Greenway.

The bridge was constructed in 1903 by the Pennsylvania Railroad (PRR). The line was electrified by 1933 and between 1948-1950 the bridge was encased in concrete.

The bridge was documented by the Historic American Engineering Record in 1977. It is contributing property of the unlisted Pennsylvania Railroad New York to Philadelphia Historic District (ID#4568), designated in 2002 by the New Jersey State Historic Preservation Office.

Earlier bridges
The first crossing of the Raritan at this point was wooden bridge on masonry substructure, constructed in 1838 by the United New Jersey Railroad and Canal Company. The -foot long draw span was renewed in 1872.

In 1877 work began on the replacement with the intention to build a double-track iron structure of seven iron fixed deck-spans having three trusses each with stone-arch approaches. While construction was underway this bridge was entirely destroyed by fire on March 9, 1878. Traffic was resumed over a temporary structure five days later.

Literary significance
In the Pulitzer Prize winning novel The Brief Wondrous Life of Oscar Wao by Junot Diaz, the title character becomes so frustrated and despondent over the futility of his romantic pursuits that he gets drunk, walks out onto the Raritan River railroad bridge, and attempts suicide by jumping off, surviving only because he lands in the shrubs on a garden divider on Route 18. Later he regretfully explains to his friend Yunior, "It was foolish. Ill-advised."

Gallery

See also
List of crossings of the Raritan River
List of NJT movable bridges
County Yard
List of bridges documented by the Historic American Engineering Record in New Jersey
List of Northeast Corridor infrastructure

References

External links

Amtrak bridges
NJ Transit bridges
New Brunswick, New Jersey
Highland Park, New Jersey
Bridges over the Raritan River
Bridges in Middlesex County, New Jersey
Bridges completed in 1903
1903 establishments in New Jersey
Pennsylvania Railroad bridges
Historic American Engineering Record in New Jersey